Oksza may refer to:
Oksza coat of arms
Oksza, Lubusz Voivodeship (west Poland)